Sir Arthur Acheson, 5th Baronet (26 January 1688 – 8 February 1748) was an Irish politician and baronet.

The son of Sir Nicholas Acheson, 4th Baronet, he succeeded to the baronetcy upon the death of his father. In 1728, he was appointed High Sheriff of Armagh. Acheson sat in the Irish House of Commons for Mullingar from 1727 until his death in 1748.

Acheson had a personal library of some significance, which he marked with his characteristic early armorial bookplate. 

He married Anne Savage in 1715, with whom he had the following children:
Nicholas Acheson (b. bef. 1716–1717)
Philip Acheson (b. bef. 1718–1727)
Archibald Acheson, 1st Viscount Gosford (1718–1790)
Nicola Acheson (1725-1761) married Robert Trench
Ann Acheson (d. 1785) married Walter Cope
Arthur (d. 1758)

References

thePeerage.com
 Burkes Irish Family Records p. 410 1976 edition

1688 births
1748 deaths
Baronets in the Baronetage of Nova Scotia
High Sheriffs of Armagh
Irish MPs 1727–1760
Members of the Parliament of Ireland (pre-1801) for County Westmeath constituencies
Freemasons of the Premier Grand Lodge of England